Carme  may refer to:
 Carme (given name)
 Carme (moon), a moon of Jupiter
 Carme (mythology), a figure in Greek mythology
 Carme group, a group of satellites orbiting Jupiter
 Carme, Barcelona, a village in Barcelona province, Catalonia, Spain
"Carmè", song by Ernesto de Curtis (1875-1937)

See also
 Carmen (surname)